Y los declaro marido y mujer (English title:And I now pronounce you husband and wife) is a Venezuelan telenovela produced and broadcast by RCTV between 2006 and 2007 and distributed internationally by RCTV International.

Marjorie de Sousa and Juan Pablo Raba starred as the main protagonists with Veronica Schneider, Hugo Vasquez and Christina Dieckmann accompanying them as co-protagonists. Marlene De Andrade and Carlos Guillermo Haydon starred as the main antagonists.

Synopsis
Four beautiful women: Saoia, Elizabeth, Rebecca and Eloína, are part of the paradise island of Margarita, between necessity and convenience for their partner deal with issues of fidelity and love navigating the difficult waters of interest personal and real feelings.

One disappointment is the beginning of the story: Saoia Ephraim discovers that her boyfriend is married and this, to be discovered, promises to divorce without making good his promise, as a daughter still Eloína joins his wife, who will make happiness impossible .

On the way through John Andrew, married to Elizabeth, who is the boss at the ad agency in charge of a campaign to Margarita Island.

Rebecca, who believes he is happily married, discovers that her marriage is a sham concocted by Gustavo. Her friend Elizabeth is the symbol of the good life while her husband refuses to have children.

Four seasoned women, different, sweet and sometimes jealous, facing in a merciless war for control of the territory and the love of his men.

Cast

References

External links

Venezuelan telenovelas
RCTV telenovelas
2006 telenovelas
Spanish-language telenovelas
2006 Venezuelan television series debuts
2007 Venezuelan television series endings
Television shows set in Caracas